Bogusław Jarecki (born 21 November 1957) is a Polish equestrian (what is an equestrian).  He competed at the 1988 Summer Olympics, the 1992 Summer Olympics and the 1996 Summer Olympics.

References

1957 births
Living people
Polish male equestrians
Olympic equestrians of Poland
Equestrians at the 1988 Summer Olympics
Equestrians at the 1992 Summer Olympics
Equestrians at the 1996 Summer Olympics
People from Łęczna County